Kamaladalam is a 1992 Indian Malayalam-language musical drama film written by A. K. Lohithadas and directed by Sibi Malayil, starring Mohanlal, Murali, Vineeth, Nedumudi Venu, Thikkurissy Sukumaran Nair, Monisha, Parvathy Jayaram and Sukumari. The film was produced by Mohanlal through his company Pranavam Arts and features original songs composed by Raveendran with a background score by Johnson. The story was inspired by the Telugu film Sagara Sangamam directed by K. Viswanath.

Plot 

Nandagopan is a respected dance teacher at the Kerala Kala Mandiram (alluding to the famed Kerala Kalamandalam repertory, which performs Kerala's temple arts). However, his life turned upside down when his wife Sumangala committed suicide as a result of a heated spat between them, during which Nandagopan challenged Sumangala that he wouldn't care if she died and that he would be much relieved if she were dead. A broken-hearted Sumangala taking his words seriously, alighted herself on fire. Nandagopan's efforts to save her were in vain. Sumangala had once before marriage also attempted suicide. The reason being Nandagopan, unaware of her feelings for him, was preparing to marry someone else. She left a suicide note in which she had written that she was in love with Nandagopan but did not have the courage to reveal her feelings to him and that she can't bear to see him married to another lady. Fortunately she was saved on time, the first time, and Nandagopan married her.

In the film, Sumangala's death is only revealed later to Malavika (Monisha). People start thinking he killed his own wife. Saddened with grief, he becomes alcoholic. He comes every day to Kalamandalam and creates chaos. On one such occasion when he did this the police took him away as the new secretary of the institute, Velayudhan (Nedmudi Venu) wants him to be sacked, but his former reputation gives him a reprieve. Once when he commented on Malavika's dance, she feels very bad and started thinking bad on him. Meanwhile, Soman (Vineeth) is in love with Malavika.

A few days later, the institution decides Malavika's Arangettam is to be performed. On the day of the performance, Nandagopan decides to test her focus and creates chaos, she immediately stops and the whole Arangettam is gone. Later, when the students strike, when he debates and apologises, they are satisfied. One day when Malavika asks him to stop drinking, he tells her his story, he had specially composed Sita Ramayana for his wife and now she is dead. Determined, Malavika decides to perform it.

Meanwhile, while the closeness of the guru and Shishya increases, there are many rumours. Soman tries to kill at first but he fails. On the day Malavika's program he mixes pesticide powder in a drink and is shocked when his brother tells there is nothing wrong between guru and Shishya and they have blessed him. He is filled with grief and confesses the truth to his brother. They both are literally frightened and see the drink bottle in principal, Malavika and Nandagopan's hands. Initially, it reaches to Nandagopan. And during the last scene his mouth is full of blood and everyone is horrified, but he compels the program to be completed. Soon the program is completed and he falls down into the arms of Soman and Malavika and he dies, imagining Sumangala calling him to her.

Cast 

 Mohanlal as Nandagopan, a respected dance teacher at the Kerala Kala Mandiram
 Monisha as Malavika Nangyar, A talented dance student at the Kerala Kala Mandiram
 Parvathy Jayaram as Sumangala, Nandagopan's wife
 Vineeth as Somashekharanunni, Malavika's lover
 Murali as Madhavanunni, Somashekharanunni's elder brother
 Oduvil Unnikrishnan as Ravunni Nambeesan Aasan, Malavika's father and Principal of Kerala Kala Mandiram
 Nedumudi Venu as Velayudhan, Secretary of Kerala Kala Mandiram
 Thikkurissy Sukumaran Nair as Director of Kerala Kala Mandiram (as Himself)
 Sukumari as Dance Teacher at Kerala Kala Mandiram
 Bindu Panicker as Madhavanunni's wife
 Mamukoya as Kala Mandiram Hydrose, Nandagopan's friend
 Kozhikode Shantha Devi as Nandagopan's mother
 Santhakumari as Malavika's mother
 Kozhikode Narayanan Nair as Nadagopan's uncle
 Valsala Menon as Dance Teacher at Kerala Kala Mandiram
 Bobby Kottarakkara as Mridangam Teacher at Kerala Kala Mandiram
 Kunchan as Sankaran, a staff at Kerala Kala Mandiram
 Alummoodan as Theatrical troupe owner 
 Nandhu as student at kala mandiram
 Yadu Krishnan
 Suma Jayaram as Maya, cameo role in Nandagopan's "Pennukanal"

Soundtrack 

The acclaimed soundtrack of this movie was composed by Raveendran, for which the acclaimed lyrics were penned by Kaithapram and Alaipayuthey by Oothukkadu Venkatasubba Iyer.

Release

Reception
The film was a critical and commercial success. The film had a 150-day run in Kerala. The performances of Mohanlal, Parvathy, Vineeth and Monisha were well received. It was one of the last films acted by Monisha before her death. This film was one of the biggest hits in Parvathy's career.

Awards

 Kerala Film Chamber Award

 Best Music Director - Raveendran
 Best Male Playback Singer - K. J. Yesudas

References

External links 
 
 Kamaladalam at BizHat 

1992 films
Films scored by Raveendran
1990s Malayalam-language films
Indian musical drama films
Films shot in Thrissur
Pranavam Arts International films
Films directed by Sibi Malayil
Films with screenplays by A. K. Lohithadas